Sonya Stephens is the former president of Mount Holyoke College and the author of Baudelaire’s Prose Poems: The Practice and Politics of Irony as well as the editor of A History of Women’s Writing in France and Translation and the Arts in Modern France.

Education
Stephens studied at New Hall, a college for women at the University of Cambridge that is now known as Murray Edwards College, where she received her B.A. in modern and medieval languages. She holds a master's degree in French studies from the Université de Montréal and a doctorate in French from the University of Cambridge.

Faculty career
She was chair of the Department of French at Royal Holloway, University of London and later chaired the Department of French and Italian and served as the first vice provost for undergraduate education at Indiana University Bloomington. She joined Mount Holyoke College in 2013 as dean of faculty and vice president for academic affairs. She became acting president in July 2016, following the resignation of Lynn Pasquerella. Stephens was officially named president on April 23, 2018. On March 2, 2022, Stephens announced she will be resigning in August 2022 to lead the American University of Paris. Dr. Beverly Daniel Tatum succeeded her as interim president, beginning in July 2022.

Selected works

References 

American women academics
Mount Holyoke College faculty
Presidents and Principals of Mount Holyoke College
Alumni of New Hall, Cambridge
Linguists from the United States
Women linguists
Year of birth missing (living people)
Living people
Université de Montréal alumni
Place of birth missing (living people)
Indiana University Bloomington faculty
Academics of Royal Holloway, University of London
American academic administrators
Women heads of universities and colleges
21st-century American women